Robert Peter Regh (October 11, 1912 – June 24, 1999) was an American professional basketball player. He played for the Sheboygan Red Skins in the National Basketball League and averaged 1.0 point per game. Regh also competed in independent leagues as well as the Amateur Athletic Union.

In 1942–43 he won the NBL championship while playing for the Red Skins.

References

1912 births
1999 deaths
Amateur Athletic Union men's basketball players
American men's basketball players
Basketball players from Wisconsin
Forwards (basketball)
Guards (basketball)
Sheboygan Red Skins players
Sportspeople from Kenosha, Wisconsin